Alen Babić (born 17 November 1990) is a Croatian professional boxer. As an amateur, he competed at the 2017 European Championships in the heavyweight event.

Amateur boxing career
Babić took part in the 2014 Croatian National Championship, facing Marino Bajamic in the quarterfinals. He beat Bajamic by RSC,  Josip Bepo Filipi by split decision in the semifinals, and  Petar Milas by RSC in the finals. He fought twice in the 11th Mustafa Hajrulahović Memorial tournament, beating Erik Tlkanec by split decision, and Pirro Quni by retirement.

Babić participated in the 2015 Croatian National Championship. He beat Petar Milas by a first-round TKO in the quarterfinals, Josip Bepo Filipi by unanimous decision in the semifinals, but lost to Marko Calic in the finals by unanimous decision. In the 2016 Croatian National Championships, he beat Valentin Kajtazi and Toni Filipi by RSC in the quarterfinals and semifinals respectively, before fighting a rematch with Marko Calic in the finals. Babić was more successful in the rematch, winning by split decision.

In his first tournament of 2016, Babić fought in the 43rd Chemiepokal. He defeated Albon Pervizaj by majority decision, and lost to Sadam Magomedov by split decision, earning him the bronze medal. In April 2016, Babič fought Nikolajs Grisunins in the first round of the Olympic qualification tournament. He beat Grisunins by RSC, but lost the quarterfinal bout against Paul Omba Biongolo by RSC in turn.

He lost the opening fight of the 2017 European Boxing Championships, dropping a split decision to Kristiyan Dimitrov.

He won a silver medal in the 2018 Croatian National Championships, beating Luka Pratljacic by unanimous decision in the quarterfinals, but losing by unanimous decision to Toni Filipi in the semifinals. The two of them fought a rematch in the finals of the 2019 Croatian National Championships, with Filipi once again winning, and Babić earning a silver medal. In between these two fights, Babić also participated in the 2019 Slovenia Grand Prix, where he defeated Angelo Gentile by RSC in the semifinals, and Victor Schelstraete by split decision in the finals.

Professional boxing career
Babić made his professional debut in July 2019, against Lazar Stojanović. Babić won the fight by TKO, stopping the Serbian in the second round. In his next two fights, Babić scored a first-round knockout of Morgan Dessaux and a second-round knockout of Ramazi Gogichashvili.

Babić didn't fight in the first half of 2020, due to the COVID-19 pandemic. For his first fight of 2020, Babić was scheduled to fight Shawndell Winters. He won the fight by a second-round TKO. He fought twice more in 2020, scoring third-round TKOs of Niall Kennedy and Tom Little.

On June 12, 2021, Babic fought and defeated Damien Chambers via a third round KO to improve to 7–0. Babic followed this up with another victory against Mark Bennett on 7th August 2021, claiming victory after Bennett pulled out after the fifth round.

Professional boxing record

See also
 List of male boxers

References

External links 

1994 births
Living people
Heavyweight boxers
Croatian male boxers
Sportspeople from Zagreb
Sportspeople from Rijeka
Bridgerweight boxers